Lodderena omanensis is a species of minute sea snail, a marine gastropod mollusk in the family Skeneidae.

Distribution
This marine species occurs in the Gulf of Oman.

References

External links
 To World Register of Marine Species

omanensis
Gastropods described in 1996